Acamptogenotia is an extinct genus of predatory sea snails, marine gastropod mollusks belonging to the family Turridae.

First appearing 48.6 Ma and believed to go extinct 7.2 Ma. Specimens of Acamptogenotia have been found in Austria, Denmark, Germany, The Netherlands, The UK, and The continental United States. The Acamptogenotia lived during the Paleocene epoch of Denmark and Greenland, The Oligocene epoch of Mexico, and in the Pliocene epoch of Italy

Description
The ovate, fusiform, shell is short and stout. The spire is about the length of the aperture. The columella is straight, very short, axis impervious. The siphonal canal is very short and wide. The anal sulcus is wide, moderately deep, close to the suture. The spiral sculpture is feeble. The axial sculpture consists of moderately strong riblets. The  operculum is wide, ovate, with apical nucleus. The type species is Pleurotoma intorta described by Brocchi in 1814.

Species
 Acamptogenotia alazana (Cooke 1928)
 Acamptogenotia colpophora Cossmann, 1889
 Acamptogenotia coronata (Lamarck, 1803) (synonym: Fusus coronatus Lamarck, 1803) 
 Acamptogenotia heilprini Aldrich 1885
 Acamptogenotia intorta Brocchi 1814
 Acampiogenotia liancurtensis (de Boury, 1899) (synonym: Genotia liancurtensis de Boury, 1899
 Acamptogenoiia loustaui (Deshayes, 1865) 
 Acampiogenotia quieta (Deshayes, 1865)

References

Further reading
Révision des pleurotomes éocènes du Bassin de Paris (suite). La Feuille des Jeunes Naturalistes (3)29, n° 340: 62-65
 Bouchet, P., J.-P. Rocroi, J. Frýda, B. Hausdorf, W. Ponder, Á. Valdés & A. Warén. 2005. Classification and nomenclator of gastropod families. Malacologia 47 (1-2): 1-397.
 Powell, A. W. B. 1966. The molluscan families Speightiidae and Turridae: An evaluation of the valid taxa, both Recent and fossil, with lists of characteristic species. Bulletin of the Auckland Institute and Museum 5: 1-184, pl. 1-23.

External links
 Museo Geologico
 Società Italiana di Malacologia
 MNHN, Paris: Genotia liancurtensis

Conoidea
Paleocene first appearances
Pliocene extinctions